The Council of the Federation is a congress that meets twice annually and comprises the premiers of each of Canada's 13 provinces and territories, the main function of which is to provide a united front amongst the provincial and territorial governments when interacting with Canada's federal government. It also promotes "constructive Confederation", working for Canadian unity, and recognizing differences amongst the various provinces and territories within Canada's federal system of government.

History
The idea for a body akin to the Council of the Federation had long been present, but suggestions did not come to fruition until after Quebec Premier Jean Charest raised the concept again during preparation for negotiations with the federal government. The idea was for the first time embraced by all the premiers and the council was formed, its foundation being announced on December 5, 2003, in Charlottetown, Prince Edward Island. This location was significant because Charlottetown was in 1864 the venue for the Charlottetown Conference (the first step towards Canadian Confederation).

The first test of the council's united front occurred between September 13 and 16, 2004, when the premiers met with Prime Minister Paul Martin to discuss reforms to Canada's universal healthcare program. The premiers remained united and in the end won $41 billion of federal funding for healthcare over the next ten years.

The 2008 meetings of the Council took place in Quebec City, which was celebrating its 400th birthday as a settlement. At the meeting all premiers agreed to amendments to the Agreement on Internal Trade to create greater labour mobility between the provinces and territories, which came into force on January 1, 2009.

The 2009 meetings of the council took place in Regina, Saskatchewan. The agenda was dominated by economic matters including trade issues with the United States and formulating a post-recession interprovincial economic strategy.

On February 20, 2010, the council met with their American counterpart, the National Governors Association, in a Washington, D.C. hotel, for an hour-long session entitled "Common Border, Common Ground" to talk about issues such as environment and trade. Also attending this meeting were Lisa P. Jackson, of the United States Environmental Protection Agency (EPA), and Larry Summers, U.S. President Barack Obama's economic advisor. The Canadian premiers commented on how much more open the Obama administration was to confronting and solving problems, compared to his predecessor, George W. Bush.

Issues
 Healthcare funding and innovation
 Economic development (especially in the wake of the Bovine spongiform encephalopathy crisis)
 Strengthening Confederation (working for provincial input into the selection of senators and Supreme Court Justices)
 Reaching out to young Canadians, getting them involved in the political process
 Helping those affected by emergencies
 Inter-provincial/territorial trade
 Water

Members 

Source:

See also
 First Ministers' conference
 Politics of Canada
 Political culture of Canada
 Council of Australian Governments
 National Governors Association

Notes and references

External links

The Council of the Federation
CBC News: Provinces plan 'historic' change to federation
Maple Leaf Web: Council of the Federation

Political terminology in Canada